Dédougou Airport  is a public use airport located near Dédougou, Mouhoun, Burkina Faso.

See also
List of airports in Burkina Faso

References

External links 
 Airport record for Dédougou Airport at Landings.com

Airports in Burkina Faso
Mouhoun Province